Gloria Russell (January 24, 1912 – February 13, 1963) was an American athlete. Competing in the javelin throw, she finished sixth at the 1932 Summer Olympics. Nationally she placed second in 1928, third in 1932 and fourth in 1929. In 1928–29 she was voted California Girls' State Athlete of the Year. Besides athletics Russell played softball for the J. J. Krieg women's team, which won the national title in 1938 and 1939. In 1929 she also won the national title in the baseball throw. Russell was severely injured in June 1931, when she was hit by a javelin.

References

1912 births
1963 deaths
Athletes (track and field) at the 1932 Summer Olympics
American female javelin throwers
Olympic track and field athletes of the United States
Sportspeople from Eureka, California
20th-century American women